Let me tell you may refer to:

 Let me tell you, a novella by Paul Griffiths (writer)
 Let Me Tell You, a posthumous collection of work by Shirley Jackson, published by Random House in 2015
 Let me tell you (Abrahamsen), a composition for soprano and symphony orchestra by Hans Abrahamsen
  "Let Me Tell You", song by Julian Lennon from The Secret Value of Daydreaming